İkinci Hacallı (until 2008, Hacıalılı) is a village and municipality in the Barda Rayon of Azerbaijan.  It has a population of 1,330.

References 

Populated places in Barda District